The Bombardier HR616, also known as the MLW HR616, was a 6 axle,  freight locomotive manufactured in Montreal, Quebec, Canada. After the demonstration, they were returned to CN and reverted to their original 2100–2103 numbers.

The model designation stood for HR - High Reliability, 616 - 6 axles, 16 cylinder engine. One notable feature was the HR616 debuted the CN designed "Draper Taper" cowl car body as well as #2119 was the first to feature a desktop style control stand. The locomotives were retired from CN's fleet in the mid to late 1990s (2105 was first due to wreck damage suffered near London, Ontario), all units have been scrapped.

See also 
 List of MLW diesel locomotives

References

Notes

Bibliography

 |

HR616
HR616
C-C locomotives
Railway locomotives introduced in 1982
Diesel-electric locomotives of Canada
Canadian National Railway locomotives
 Scrapped locomotives
Standard gauge locomotives of Canada
Freight locomotives